Bearberries (indigenous kinnickinnick) are three species of dwarf shrubs in the genus Arctostaphylos. Unlike the other species of Arctostaphylos (see manzanita), they are adapted to Arctic and Subarctic climates, and have a circumpolar distribution in northern North America, Asia and Europe.

Description
Bearberries grow as low-lying bushes and these shrubs are green coloured year round. Furthermore, one can see from the images that they have a  round shape to them as well. They are capable of surviving on soils predominantly composed of sand. In Canada, they are found in the Northern Latitude forests, and they can also be found growing on gravel surfaces.

Species  
The name "bearberry" for the plant derives from the edible fruit which is a favorite food of bears. The fruit are edible and are sometimes gathered as food for humans. The leaves of the plant are used in herbal medicine.

 Alpine bearberry: Arctostaphylos alpina (L.) Spreng (syn. Arctous alpinus (L.) Niedenzu). This is a procumbent shrub . Leaves not winter green, but dead leaves persist on stems for several years. Berries dark purple to black. Distribution: circumpolar, at high latitudes, from Scotland east across Scandinavia, Russia, Alaska, Canada and Greenland; southern limits in Europe in the Pyrenees and the Alps, in Asia to the Altay Mountains, and in North America to British Columbia in the west, and Maine and New Hampshire in the United States in the east.
 Red bearberry: Arctostaphylos rubra (Rehd. & Wilson) Fernald (syn. Arctous rubra (Rehder and E.H. Wilson) Nakai; Arctous alpinus var. ruber Rehd. and Wilson). This is a procumbent shrub . Leaves deciduous, falling in autumn to leave bare stems. Berries red. Distribution: in the mountains of Sichuan, southwestern China north and east to eastern Siberia, Alaska and northern Canada east to northern Quebec.
 Common bearberry: Arctostaphylos uva-ursi (L.) Spreng.

Uses

The berries ripen late in the year, and can be eaten raw.

The plant contains diverse phytochemicals, including ursolic acid, tannic acid, gallic acid, some essential oils and resin, hydroquinones (mainly arbutin, up to 17%), tannins (up to 15%), phenolic glycosides and flavonoids.

Native American Indians traditionally made use of the plant's leaves, which they gathered in summer and dried for use as a tobacco substitute or mixed with tobacco.

Folk medicine
The dried leaves can be used in teas, liquid diffusions, tea bags or tablets for traditional medicine. Bearberry appears to be relatively safe, although large doses may cause nausea, vomiting, fever, chills, back pain and tinnitus. Cautions for use apply during pregnancy, breast feeding, or in people with kidney disease.

The efficacy and safety of bearberry treatment in humans remain unproven, as no clinical trials exist to interpret effects on any disease.

History and folklore

Bearberry was first documented in The Physicians of Myddfai, a 13th-century Welsh herbal. It was also described by Clusius in 1601, and recommended for medicinal use in 1763 by Gerhard and others. Often called uva-ursi, from the Latin uva, "grape, berry of the vine", ursi, "bear", i.e. "bear's grape". It first appeared in the London Pharmacopoeia in 1788.

Folk tales suggest Marco Polo thought the Chinese were using it as a diuretic. Bearberry leaves are used in traditional medicine in parts of Europe, and are officially classified as a phytomedicine. Native Americans use bearberry leaves with tobacco and other herbs in religious ceremonies, both as a smudge (type of incense) or smoked in a sacred pipe carrying the smoker's prayers to the Great Spirit. When mixed with tobacco or other herbs, it is referred to as kinnikinnick, from an Algonquian (probably Delaware) word for "mixture". Among the ingredients in kinnikinnick were non-poisonous sumac leaves, and the inner bark of certain bushes such as red osier dogwood (silky cornell), chokecherry, and alder, to improve the taste of the bearberry leaf.

References

External links
 European Medicines Agency, Committee on Herbal Medicinal Products (HMPC) (30 January 2018). Assessment report on Arctostaphylos uva-ursi (L.) Spreng., folium, London

Plant common names
Arctostaphylos
Flora of Canada
Flora of Oregon
Medicinal plants of Asia
Medicinal plants of Central America
Medicinal plants of Europe
Medicinal plants of North America
Flora without expected TNC conservation status